The 2010–11 Liga Nacional de Básquet season was the 27th season of the top professional basketball league in Argentina. The regular season started on 15 October 2010. Peñarol won their third title, defeating Atenas in the finals.

Promotions and relegations
Torneo Nacional de Ascenso Champions from the previous season Monte Hermoso Básquet and runners-up Argentino de Junín were promoted, occupying the berths left by Quilmes and Central Entrerriano. Both teams would return to the Torneo Nacional de Ascenso at the end of the season after losing their respective relegation series.

Clubs

Regular season

First stage
The first stage took place between 15 October and 3 December 2010. Teams were divided into two zones. The top three teams from each zone plus the best fourth team overall and a wildcard competed in the Torneo Súper 8 that took place in December.

North Zone

South Zone

Torneo Súper 8
The seventh edition of Torneo Súper 8 took place on 16–20 December 2010 in the city of Formosa. Atenas won their first title, defeating Peñarol in the Final.

Second stage
The second stage started on 6 December 2010. All 16 teams were ranked together. Each team carried over half of the points obtained in the first stage.

Playoffs

Championship playoffs
The Playoffs started on 6 April 2011 and ended on 5 June 2011. Peñarol defeated Atenas in the Finals.

Relegation playoffs
The relegation series began on 8 April. Monte Hermoso Básquet and Argentino de Junín lost their respective series and were relegated to the Torneo Nacional de Ascenso.

Clubs in international competitions

Awards

Yearly Awards
Most Valuable Player: Juan Pedro Gutiérrez, Obras Sanitarias
Best Foreign Player:  David Jackson, Libertad
Sixth Man of the Year: Juan Espil, Bahía Basket
Rookie of the Year: Miguel Gerlero, Atenas
Coach of the Year: Julio Lamas, Obras Sanitarias
Most Improved Player: Alexis Elsener, Obras Sanitarias
All-Tournament Team:
 F Alex Galindo, Libertad
 F Federico Kammerichs, Regatas Corrientes
 C Juan Pedro Gutiérrez, Obras Sanitarias
 G Juan Ignacio Sánchez, Bahía Basket
 G David Jackson, Libertad

References
Guía Oficial 2016/2017, laliganacional.com.ar. Retrieved 16 May 2017.

Liga Nacional de Básquet seasons
   
Argentina